Zorrita Martinez (Spanish: Zorrita Martínez) is a 1975 Spanish comedy drama film directed by Vicente Escrivá and starring José Luis López Vázquez, Nadiuska and Manuel Zarzo. A Venezuelan performer living in Spain, gets married so she can get a permit to stay in the country.

The film's sets were designed by the art director Adolfo Cofiño.

Cast
 José Luis López Vázquez as Serafín 
 Nadiuska as Zorrita  
 Manuel Zarzo as Manolo  
 Bárbara Rey as Bibiana  
 Rafael Alonso as Don Arturo  
 Fernando Santos as Comisario  
 Jesús Guzmán as Subirana 
 Francisco Cecilio as Mariquita  
 José Luis Lizalde
 Luis Barbero as Sacerdote 
 Emilio S. Espinosa 
 Carmen Platero 
 José Alonso 
 Yolanda Farr 
 Mariano Venancio 
 Raquel Rodrigo as Monja  
 Judy Stephen as Mujer de Jonathan 
 Víctor Israel as Paciente con muletas  
 Alfonso del Real as Ortigosa  
 Juana Jiménez 
 Marisa Bell as Corista 
 Lola Lemos
 Emilio Fornet as Paciente  
 Scott Miller as Jonathan  
 Fabián Conde as Paciente  
 Elmer Modling as Americano  
 Guadalupe Muñoz Sampedro as Madre superiora  
 Alberto de Mendoza as Antonio

References

Bibliography
 Rafael de España. Directory of Spanish and Portuguese film-makers and films. Greenwood Press, 1994.

External links 
 

1975 films
Spanish comedy-drama films
1975 comedy-drama films
1970s Spanish-language films
Films directed by Vicente Escrivá
1975 comedy films
1975 drama films
1970s Spanish films